Pine Valley Peak is a  mountain located in Zion National Park in Washington County, Utah, United States.

Description
Its neighbors include North Guardian Angel,  to the southeast, and South Guardian Angel,  to the south-southeast. Precipitation runoff from this mountain drains into tributaries of the Virgin River. Access to this peak is via the Kolob Terrace Road. This peak's name was officially adopted in 1934 by the U.S. Board on Geographic Names.

Climate
Spring and fall are the most favorable seasons to visit Pine Valley Peak. According to the Köppen climate classification system, it is located in a Cold semi-arid climate zone, which is defined by the coldest month having an average mean temperature below 32 °F (0 °C), and at least 50% of the total annual precipitation being received during the spring and summer.

Gallery

See also

 List of mountains of Utah
 Geology of the Zion and Kolob canyons area
 Colorado Plateau

References

External links

 Zion National Park National Park Service
 Pine Valley Peak: Weather forecast
 Pine Valley Peak climbing: mountainproject.com

Mountains of Utah
Zion National Park
Mountains of Washington County, Utah
Sandstone formations of the United States
North American 2000 m summits